Chanzhou or Chan Prefecture was a zhou (prefecture) in imperial China seated in modern Puyang, Henan, China. It was established in 621 during the Tang dynasty.

In 1106 the Song dynasty elevated the prefecture to a higher status, changing its name to Kaide Prefecture. This name remained until 1142 when it was changed back to Chan Prefecture by the Jin dynasty, who had captured the territory from the Song dynasty. In 1144 the name was changed to Kai Prefecture.

Geography
The administrative region of Chan Prefecture in the Tang dynasty is under the administration of modern Puyang in northeastern Henan: 
 Puyang
 Puyang County
 Qingfeng County
 Fan County
 Nanle County

See also
Kaizhou (disambiguation)

References
 

Prefectures of the Tang dynasty
Prefectures of the Song dynasty
Prefectures of Later Liang (Five Dynasties)
Prefectures of Later Tang
Prefectures of Later Jin (Five Dynasties)
Prefectures of Later Han (Five Dynasties)
Prefectures of Later Zhou
Prefectures of the Jin dynasty (1115–1234)
Former prefectures in Henan